Anna Rheinholdsdotter Leuhusen (died c. 1554), was the Abbess of St. Clare's Priory in Stockholm. She became known for her involvement in the Swedish War of Liberation between Sweden and Denmark in the 1520s.

Background
Anna Leuhusen was born the child of Reinhold Leuhusen, merchant in Stockholm, and the sister of Martin Leuhusen, who is listed as a member of the city council of 1521; Martin Leuhusen was a fervent Catholic who did not convert until 1536. Her sister was married to the Danish colonel Gregorius Holst. The year of her birth is unknown. Anna Lehusen entered the Clara Abbey as a member of the order of Saint Clare of Assisi. She was appointed abbess sometime prior to 1508. This year, she is confirmed as such, when she appealed to the city for economic assistance in her capacity of abbess.

Act during the war
During this period, Sweden and Denmark, formally united through the Kalmar Union, was involved in various warfare which eventually led to the Swedish War of Liberation. In 1520, the city of Stockholm was sieged and taken by the Danes after the defeat of Christina Gyllenstierna. Soon after, however, the rest of Sweden rose in rebellion and in 1522, the city was besieged by the Swedes under Gustav Vasa. During the siege, the St. Clare's Priory was used as an escape channel by people who wished to join the Swedes outside the city, both merchants and courtiers.

Leuhusen was a Danish loyalist and, according to the legend, responsible for betraying several of these people. During the day, she signaled by hanging a white cloth out of the window and, during the night, a lamp to the part of the convent facing the city, as a sign to the Danes that there were refugees in the building. When they left the convent on their way outside the city, they were taken by the Danes and executed for treason. This was performed in collaboration with her brother-in-law, the Danish loyalist mayor of Stockholm.

Later life
In June 1523, Stockholm was retaken by the Swedes and made capital of the independent Kingdom of Sweden. In 1525, Elin Thomasdotter is noted to have replaced Anna Leuhusen as abbess. The St. Clare's Priory was one of the first convents to be dissolved during the Swedish Reformation in 1527. This has been contributed to the acts of Anna Leuhusen during the war, for which the King felt vengeful. Former Abbess Anna Leuhusen and the rest of the nuns was allowed to settle in the dissolved Grey Friar Abbey, which had been left empty by the monks, where they worked as nurses the rest of their lives.

Anna Leuhusen is known to have kept one of the convent most treasured possessions. When the abbey was founded in 1288, Princess Richenza of Sweden had entered it, and became its abbess in 1335. Richenza possessed a golden chain, which was consequently used by the abbesses of the abbey for centuries. Anna Leuhusen kept this chain when the abbey was dissolved and gave it to her family.

Anna Leuhusen was still alive in 1550. She is believed to have died around 1554.

See also
Brita Tott
Magdalena Rudenschöld

Notes

References
Anteckningar om svenska qvinnor
Svenska Familj-Journalen / Band 14, årgång 1875 
https://web.archive.org/web/20070218214012/http://histvarld.historiska.se/histvarld/sok/artikel.asp?id=21016
http://fornvannen.se/pdf/1950talet/1958_047.pdf
Martin Berntson. Klostren och reformationen. Upplösningen av kloster och konvent i Sverige 1523–1596. Malmö 2003.
 Lisbet Scheutz (2001 (2003) nuytgåva). Berömda och glömda stockholmskvinnor: sju stadsvandringar: 155 kvinnoporträtt. (Famous and forgotten women of Stockholm: seven tours: 155 female profiles) Stockholm: MBM.  Libris 8392583

Swedish Roman Catholic abbesses
15th-century births
1554 deaths
Women in 16th-century warfare
Poor Clare abbesses
People of the Swedish War of Liberation
Women in war in Sweden
16th-century Swedish nuns
15th-century Swedish nuns